Kisses for Breakfast may refer to:

Kisses for Breakfast (film), 1941
"Kisses for Breakfast" (song), 2014